Mogili is a small village located in the Bangarupalem mandal (Revenue division) of Chittoor District, Andhra Pradesh in southern India.

It is on the Palamaneru – Bangarupalem – Chittoor segment of the National Highway No. 4, which connects Mumbai on the west coast of India with Chennai city on the east coast. One has to travel 10 km from Palamaneru  towards Chittoor to reach the village. Chittoor, the district headquarters, is at a distance of 25 km from the village. 

Populated coastal places in India
Villages in Chittoor district